The Alternate, novel by John Martel (novelist)
The Alternate (film)
"The Alternate" (Star Trek: Deep Space Nine)